The Military ranks of Peru are the military insignia used by the Peruvian Armed Forces.

Commissioned officer ranks
The rank insignia of commissioned officers.

Other ranks
The rank insignia of non-commissioned officers and enlisted personnel.

Technician ranks

References

External links
 
 

Peru
Military of Peru